Sam Alex Wisniewski (born 2 October 2001) is an English cricketer. He made his Twenty20 debut 17 September 2020, for Yorkshire in the 2020 t20 Blast.

References

External links
 

2001 births
Living people
English cricketers
Yorkshire cricketers
Cricketers from Huddersfield